Theodore "Ted" Russell was an American conductor who had helped form Mississippi's first symphony orchestra the original Jackson Symphony Orchestra (JSO) during the 1940s.

References

American bandleaders
American conductors (music)
American male conductors (music)
People from Mississippi
Year of birth missing
Year of death missing